Venoco, Inc. was a company engaged in hydrocarbon exploration. It primarily operated in the Monterey Formation in California. In 2017, the company filed bankruptcy and was liquidated.

History
The company was founded in September 1992 by Timothy Marquez.

In 2005, the company sold Big Mineral Creek field for $45 million.

In November 2006, the company became a public company via an initial public offering.

In 2007, the company acquired the West Montalvo Oil Field from Berry Petroleum Company for $63 million; it was sold in 2014 to California Resources Corporation for $200 million.

In 2011, the company spent $100 million to develop wells in the  Monterey Formation.

In 2012, the company became a privately held company after Timothy Marquez acquired the 49% of the company that he did not own.

In 2015, the Refugio oil spill resulted in the closure of a pipeline upon which the company depended; as a result production was reduced by 50%. In March 2016, the company filed bankruptcy.

On April 17, 2017, Venoco filed bankruptcy again and began liquidation. At that time, the company was owned by affiliates of Apollo Global Management.

On January 4, 2018, the company relinquished 5 federal oil and gas leases offshore Southern California.

Fracking controversy
In 2011, a group of concerned citizens opposed Venoco's fracking operations in the Monterey Formation. The Santa Barbara County Board of Supervisors initially cited Venoco for fracking without a permit, but later withdrew the claim. The site of the test wells was in a valley adjacent to two wine-producing regions, Santa Ynez Valley AVA and Santa Maria Valley AVA.

In the Salinas basin, in Monterey County, Venoco encountered opposition by environmental groups and concerned citizens over 9 proposed wells. Among the components listed in Venoco's proposed fracking fluid for Monterey County was a gelling agent with a 60 to 70% concentration of "petroleum distillate blend." The exact mixture was unknown as it is proprietary to manufacturer Baker Hughes.

References

1992 establishments in Colorado
2017 disestablishments in Colorado
American companies established in 1992
Defunct companies based in Colorado
Defunct oil companies of the United States
Companies that filed for Chapter 11 bankruptcy in 2016
Companies that filed for Chapter 11 bankruptcy in 2017
Companies that have filed for Chapter 7 bankruptcy
Companies formerly listed on the New York Stock Exchange
Non-renewable resource companies disestablished in 2017